Orna Angel (born 29 July 1962) is an Israeli former politician who served as a member of the Knesset for the Labor Party for one week in February 2006.

Biography
Born in Jerusalem, Angel gained a bachelor's degree in environmental design and a master's degree in architecture from the Technion.

For the 2003 elections Angel was placed 31st on the party's list. Although she missed out on a seat when the party won 19 mandates, she entered the Knesset on 8 February 2006 as a replacement for Sofa Landver, who herself had only entered the Knesset on 11 January. However, a week later she resigned her seat due to a conflict of interest (she was employed as CEO of Tel Aviv Port, a government company) and was replaced by Neta Dobrin.

References

External links
 

1962 births
Politicians from Jerusalem
Technion – Israel Institute of Technology alumni
Israeli civil servants
Women members of the Knesset
Living people
Israeli Labor Party politicians
Members of the 16th Knesset (2003–2006)
21st-century Israeli women politicians